State Route 744 (SR 744) is an east–west state highway in southwestern Ohio, a U.S. state.

Route description

SR 744 travels through southern Preble County and northern Butler County.  No stretch of the highway is a part of the National Highway System.

History
When it was designated in 1937, SR 744 ran from its intersection where it splits off of Main Street in Somerville to its current eastern terminus at SR 122 east of Jacksonburg.  At the time, Main Street through Somerville was the routing of US 127.  By 1961, U.S. Route 127 was routed onto a new alignment west of Somerville, resulting in an extension of SR 744.  From its previous western terminus, State Route 744 was routed north along the former alignment of US 127 to the County Road 30 intersection north of Somerville, and then west to the now-current US 127 routing, which marks the current western endpoint of the state highway.

Major intersections

References

744
Transportation in Preble County, Ohio
Transportation in Butler County, Ohio